Pierre-Ernest Weiss (25 March 1865, Mulhouse – 24 October 1940, Lyon) was a French physicist who specialized in magnetism. He developed the domain theory of ferromagnetism in 1907. Weiss domains and the Weiss magneton are named after him.   Weiss also developed the molecular or mean field theory, which is often called Weiss-mean-field theory, that led to the discovery of the Curie–Weiss law. Alongside Auguste Picard, Pierre Weiss is considered one of the first discoverers of the magnetocaloric effect in 1917.

Pierre Weiss made several experimental discoveries that led to the development of the strongest electromagnets of the beginning of the 20th century. He worked at the universities of Rennes, Lyon, ETH Zurich where he was raised, and finally at Strasbourg. In these academic institutions he founded several renown laboratories.

Life 
Pierre Weiss was born in Mulhouse the 25 March 1865, where he was the first born of Emile Weiss and Ida Schlumberger. At the age of 5, Alsace was annexed to Germany. Weiss conducted his secondary studies at Mulhouse. He later left to continue higher education at the Swiss Federal Institute of Technology in Zurich (ETH), where he obtained the diploma of mechanical engineer in 1887 as the first in the grade ranking of his class. At the age of majority, he decided to take the French nationality instead of the German one. In 1888, he practices for the entry exam of the École Normale Supérieure (ENS) at the Lycée Saint-Louis, Paris, where he is admitted. After his years at the ENS, he remained there as a teacher assistant while in parallel he obtained his license in physical sciences and mathematical sciences at the Faculty of Sciences of Paris. During his time in Paris, he met several colleagues who will become famous mathematicians like Élie Cartan, Henri Lebesgue, and Émile Borel, and famous physicists like Aimé Cotton, Jean Perrin, and Paul Langevin.

In 1895, he won the title of Maître de Conférences (lecturer) at the Faculty of Sciences of the University of Rennes. In 1896, he defends his doctoral thesis in physical sciences, related to the study of the magnetization of crystallized magnetite and some iron and antimony alloys, in front of the Faculty of Science of the University of Paris. His supervisors were Jules Violle and Marcel Brillouin, and the thesis jury was comprised by Charles Friedel,  and Henry Pellatt.

In October 1896, Pierre Weiss marries Jane Rancès in Paris. Their daughter, Nicole, will later marry the French mathematician Henri Cartan.

The Dreyfus affair burst during this time. According to the witnesses testimony, collected by Nicolas Ballet, Pierre Weiss joins the academics that defend Alfred Dreyfus, who was also from Alsace origin, born in Mulhouse, and former student of ETH as him. This position was controversial in his environment at Rennes, Weiss later prefers to continue teaching at the University of Lyon in 1899 due to this issue.

Even when Pierre Weiss does take the mantle of professor at Lyon, he later accepts ETH Zurich proposal to become physics professor and director of the Institute of Physics in 1902. In 1907, he publishes an important work on the nature of ferromagnetism where he introduces the concept of molecular field, a precursor idea to mean field theory. Is at this moment in life that he mets Albert Einstein and Peter Debye, also professors at Zurich. During World War I, he comes back to France where he works with Aimé Cotton in the development of an acoustic system for tracking artillery, known as the Cotton-Weiss method.

In 1919, Strasbourg is no longer part of the German Empire but returns to France. Even when the University of Strasbourg (as Kaiser-Wilhelms-Universität de Strasbourg) benefited from important German investment, Weiss had to participate in the several endeavours that had to be performed to reintegrate the institution to the French system (as Université de Strasbourg). The French president Raymond Poincaré declared that the University of Strasbourg had to outperform its precedent German counterpart. In this manner, many faculties and subordinate institutes were also created to promote research. In this environment, Pierre Weiss chooses to become physics professor at the Faculty of Physics of the University of Strasbourg and director of the Institute of Physics. He also founded in Strasbourg, an institute focused in the research of magnetism, similar to the one he founded in Zurich. He receives the resources to gather in Strasbourg many of his collaborators from Zurich, like Gabriel Foëx, Robert Forrer and Edmond Bauer. Some of Weiss' remarkable students include Swiss explorer and inventor Auguste Picard, Spanish physicist Blas Cabrera, and Louis Néel, French Nobel laureate in physics for his work on magnetism.

According to Francis Perrin, son of Weiss' friend Jean Perrin, 

Louis Néel, young associate from the ENS, arrived at Weiss' laboratory to prepare his thesis in 1928. He becomes his assistant in 1932 and succeeds Weiss at his position in the Chair of Physics at the University of Strasbourg in 1937. Néel remarked the political fervour of Weiss, who supported Popular front which was badly seen in the mostly conservative population of Strasbourg of the time.

As a widower in 1919, Pierre Weiss remarried in 1922 to physicist Marthe Klein. In 1939, Pierre Weiss followed his friend Jean Perrin to the University of Lyon where he died in 1940.

Important works 
 G. Foëx & P. Weiss (1926), Le magnétisme, Armand Colin, Section Physique N°71.

References

External links

1865 births
1940 deaths
French physicists
ETH Zurich alumni
Academic staff of ETH Zurich
École Normale Supérieure alumni
Scientists from Mulhouse
People from Alsace-Lorraine
Members of the French Academy of Sciences